Biles Island (Lenape: Minachkonk or Menahakonk) is an island in the Delaware River in Falls Township, Bucks County, Pennsylvania.

Now owned by USX, the 567-acre Biles Island sits in the Delaware River a half mile south of Trenton, New Jersey. Since at least 1968 it has been a dumping site for silt dredged from the river.

The island takes its name from William Biles, to whom it was conveyed in about 1680 "by four local Lenapes, Orecton, Nannacus, Nenemblahocking, and Patelana, for a total of ten pounds." The island was later known as Oreclan's Island.

References 

Landforms of Bucks County, Pennsylvania
Islands of the Delaware River
River islands of Pennsylvania